Khorol is a rural locality (a selo) and the administrative center of Khorolsky District, Primorsky Krai, Russia. Population:  Founded by Ukrainian settlers from Khorol in modern Poltava Oblast, Ukraine.

References

Notes

Sources

Rural localities in Primorsky Krai